"Because of You" is a song by English singer-songwriter Gabrielle. It was written by Gabrielle and George McFarlane and produced by the latter for her debut studio album, Find Your Way (1993). Released as the album's fourth single on 14 February 1994, "Because of You" was slightly more successful than previous single "I Wish", peaking at number 24 on the UK Singles Chart.

Critical reception
Alan Jones from Music Week wrote that "Because of You" "is a gentle shuffle with widescreen orchestra and jangly acoustic guitar underpinning some excellent emoting from Gabrielle." He added, "Much in the mood of Dreams, though not so haunting, it is nonetheless a natural for the Top 20."

Track listings

Charts

References

1993 songs
1994 singles
Gabrielle (singer) songs
Go! Beat singles
Songs written by Gabrielle (singer)